Andreas Brandstätter (1959–2006) was a German diplomat. He was born in Kiel in 1959. At the age of 21 he became a United Nations worker. After living in Kiel during 20 years, he graduated at Harward. He traveled to many countries like Senegal, Sudan, and Libya. When he got to Libya he married a Bosnian woman who had escaped from the Yugoslav Wars. Then they went both to live in Switzerland; Brandstätter's wife was a doctor but he still worked for the UN. In 1997, his first was born in Geneva. When the decade started, he went to help the poor people in Sierra Leone. In 2004, he went to Port-au-Prince to help the poor kids who were fighting for the president in Haiti. In January 2006 while playing tennis, he died from a heart attack.

German diplomats
1959 births
2006 deaths
German officials of the United Nations